Heimrath is a surname. Notable people with the surname:

 Ludwig Heimrath (born 1956), Canadian former race car driver
 Ludwig Heimrath Sr. (1934–2021), German-born Canadian racing driver

German-language surnames